The IBGE (Instituto Brasileiro de Geografia e Estatística) published the resident population chart of 2010 Brazil Census.

IBGE also published on 2019 the estimate resident population with reference date 1 July 2019.

The following list of municipalities  in the state of São Paulo is compiled from these charts.

The list is sorted by "2019 (estimate)" column. On the "Population 2010" column, some municipalities are not in decreasing sequence.

List

See also
 List of cities in São Paulo

References 

Sao Paulo